Jonathan Shell (born December 1, 1987, in Danville, Kentucky) is an American politician and a former Republican member of the Kentucky House of Representatives. He represented District 71 which comprises Garrard, Rockcastle, and a portion of Madison Counties. He served as the Majority Leader of the Kentucky House of Representatives and was the youngest member of the General Assembly.

He was defeated by Travis Brenda, a teacher at Rockcastle County High School, in the 2018 Republican primary.

In August 2022, Shell announced his candidacy in the 2023 Agriculture Commissioner of Kentucky election.

Education
Shell earned his BA in agricultural business from Eastern Kentucky University.

2012 Election
When District 36 Representative Lonnie Napier retired and left the seat open, Shell won the May 22, 2012, Republican Primary with 2,102 votes (59.8%) and won the November 6, 2012, General election with 11,933 votes (63.3%) against Democratic nominee Bradley Montgomery.

References

External links
Official page at the Kentucky General Assembly
Campaign site

Jonathan Shell at Ballotpedia
Jonathan Shell at OpenSecrets

|-

1987 births
21st-century American politicians
Eastern Kentucky University alumni
Living people
Republican Party members of the Kentucky House of Representatives
People from Lancaster, Kentucky
Politicians from Danville, Kentucky